The pet industry (sometimes known as petconomy) is the market industry associated with companion animals. It includes things that are associated with the production, consumption and cultural activities linked to the market. Next to nutrition, toys and animal healthcare, new services and products like taxis, kindergartens, hotels, IT appliances, broadcasting, theme parks and funeral services are appearing on the market.

Economy 

In the United States alone between 2017 and 2018 there was an estimate of 393 million pets, making for a total pet expenditure of $72.56 billion. In Europe the total amount of companion animals in 2018 was estimated to be over 158 million pets. The total pet expenditures can be divided into nutrition, supplies/medicines, veterinarian care, live animal purchases and other services.

The most common found pet in the U.S., according to the 2019-2020 APPA National Pet Owners Survey, was the dog with 63.4 million of U.S. households owning at least as a pet. After that comes the cat with 42.7 million households keeping one. The third largest owned pet in the U.S. is the freshwater fish with 11.5 million households owning at least one fish. After that comes the bird (5.7 million households), small rodents (5.4 million households), reptiles (4.5 million households), and last saltwater fish and horses with 3.2 million households owning one.

The basic annual expenditures for keeping and maintaining a pet dog in U.S. is $1,381. For keeping a cat in the U.S. the costs come to $908 per year. These costs includes things such as surgical vets visits, routine vet visits, food, vitamins and toys.

Healthcare market 
The global animal healthcare market size in 2018 was estimated at $43.55 billion with a Compound Annual Growth Rate (CAGR) of 5.6% between 2017 and 2025. The Global Animal Health Market is estimated to reach 70.01 billion by 2026. A significant part of that is the Companion Healthcare Market estimated to be as large as $15.3 billion in 2019 and is expected to rise to 20.7 billion by 2024, with a CAGR of 6.26%. This estimated increase is mainly bound to happen due to government initiatives trying to encourage the growth of veterinary products and treatments. The boost of the market however has to do with an increase in the adoption of companion animals. The Companion Animal Healthcare Market is driven by zoonotic and foodborne diseases among companion animals, increasing companion animal ownership, healthcare concerns of pets and a rising concern for improved nutrition. A big part of the Companion Animal Healthcare Market is the investment of insurances. The Pet Insurance market is estimated to account for $10 billion by 2025. The insurance could include a multi-pet insurance plan so that multiple pet policies are covered in a single plan. An attribution to the insurance in some instances could also cover pet cremation and situations where the pet gets lost.

A positive side-effect in the economy due to the pet industry can be found in the number of visits to a healthcare agency, like a doctor. In 1998, in the United States, non-institutionalised seniors experienced 19% less encounters with healthcare instances. In 2007, in Australia, pet owners made 15% fewer visits to the doctor compared to non-pet owners. The total health expenditure savings in 2013 due to pet ownership have been estimated to account for 11% for the Australian healthcare and 24% for the German healthcare. In the UK the healthcare expenditure savings in 2013 due to the existence of companion animals are estimated to have been around £2.45 billion, £47 million per week.

Food markets 
According to the actual sales within the U.S. market in 2018 of APPA, $30.32 billion was spent on food out of $72.56 billion. on estimated 2019 sales within the U.S. market, food is estimated to increase to $31.68 billion in the U.S. The world's largest pet food markets are in the United States, France, Japan, and Germany, accounting for over half of the sales in pet food. North America is the largest geographical segment of the market studied and accounted for a share of around 39.2% of the overall market. The pet food market is segmented by animal type, product type, ingredient type, sales channel, pricing type, and geography. The shift in pet ‘ownership’ to ‘parenting’ has been a very crucial and defining trend in the pet food market, more so in the developed countries.

See also
 Animal–industrial complex
 Commodity status of animals
 Pet store 
 Cat food
 Dog food

References

Industries (economics)
Pets